Brett Porter is an Australian producer, writer and director best known for his work in TV. He worked at ATN-7 producing some of the first drama made for Australian television. He moved to the ABC in 1964, where he made documentaries and worked on Four Corners. He was then producer on Bellbird. He died in 1970 aged 57.

Select credits
Johnny Belinda (1959) - producer
Two Men of Fiji (1959)
Other People's Houses (1959)
They Were Big, They Were Blue, They Were Beautiful (1959)
Thunder of Silence (1959)
Pardon Miss Westcott (1959)
Reflections in Dark Glasses (1960)
The Story of Peter Grey (1961)
Stronger Since the War? (1964) - documentary - writer and director
Four Corners (1965) - director
Three Faces of New Guinea (1967) - documentary
Bellbird (1967) - TV series - producer
Pastures of the Blue Crane (1969)

References

External links

Brett Porter at National Film and Sound Archive

Australian television producers
Living people
Year of birth missing (living people)